Xylosyltransferase 1 is an enzyme that in humans is encoded by the XYLT1 gene.

Xylosyltransferase (XT; EC 2.4.2.26) catalyzes the transfer of UDP-xylose to serine residues within XT recognition sequences of target proteins. Addition of this xylose to the core protein is required for the biosynthesis of the glycosaminoglycan chains characteristic of proteoglycans.[supplied by OMIM]

Clinical relevance

Baratela-Scott syndrome
In 2012 Baratela-Scott syndrome was identified in humans. A GGC repeat expansion, and methylation of exon 1 of XYLT1 is a common pathogenic variant in Baratela-Scott syndrome.  

Patients with Bartarlla-Scott syndrome exhibit abnormal development of the skeleton, characteristic facial features, and cognitive developmental delay. Skeletal problems include knee cap in the wrong position, short long bones with mild changes to the  narrow portion, short palm bones with stub thumbs, short thigh necks, shallow hip sockets, and malformations of the spine. Characteristic facial features include a flattened midface with a broad nasal bridge, cleft palate, and unibrow. The syndrome also cause pre-school onset of a cognitive developmental delay, with a shortened attention span. Some of the cognitive delay is masked by a warm and engaging personality.

Axon extension
Neurons use the presence of extracellular matrix molecules as clues whether to promote or suppress extension of axons. Chondroitin sulfate proteoglycans suppress the extension of axons over the glial scar, a barrier which develops after lesioning the spinal cord. Proteoglycans consist of one relatively small protein core and attached large glycosaminoglycan side chains. To block the very formation of these side chains xylosyltransferase (XYLT1) which attaches xylose to a serine of the protein core as initiation for glycosaminoglycan chain extension, was targeted by a class of designed DNA molecules. These molecules are called DNA-enzymes which were designed to specifically cleave XYLT1 mRNA within cells. DNA-enzymes are readily taken up by mammalian cells, but are more stable and require much lower concentrations then  siRNA. XTYL1 DNA-enzyme in co-cultures of neurons with neurocan secreting cells displayed a marked increase of axon outgrowth. Rats with defined spinal cord lesions, i.a. the clinically relevant contusion injury, treated with XTYL1 DNA-enzyme administered by micro-infusion pumps or systemically achieved improvements in the horizontal ladder task, enhanced axonal plasticity, growth of the corticospinal tract, no effect on neuropathic pain when using mechanical and thermal allodynia tests and no toxicological or pathological side effects compared to control animals.

References

Further reading